Chorio, Choriò or Chorio- may refer to:

Choroid, as in chorioretinitis
Chorion, as in chorioamnionitis
Choriò, Calabria, a municipality in Calabria, Italy
Chorio, Greece (or Horio), a Greek village in the island of Halki

See also
 Kalo Chorio (disambiguation)
 Kokkino Chorio, a village in the Chania region, Crete
 Mesa Chorio, a village in the Paphos District of Cyprus 
 Pera Chorio, a village in the Nicosia District of Cyprus 
 Xiro Chorio, a borough of the city of Rethymno, on Crete